José Arón Sánchez Flores (born 4 May 2003) is a Peruvian footballer who plays as a centre-back for Academia Cantolao.

Career statistics

Club

Notes

References

2003 births
Living people
Peruvian footballers
Peru youth international footballers
Association football defenders
Esther Grande footballers
Academia Deportiva Cantolao players
Footballers from Lima